Gilbert syndrome (GS) is a syndrome in which the liver of affected individuals processes bilirubin more slowly than the majority. Many people never have symptoms. Occasionally jaundice (a slight yellowish color of the skin or whites of the eyes) may occur.

Gilbert syndrome is due to a genetic variant in the UGT1A1 gene which results in decreased activity of the bilirubin uridine diphosphate glucuronosyltransferase enzyme. It is typically inherited in an autosomal recessive pattern and occasionally in an autosomal dominant pattern depending on the type of variant. Episodes of jaundice may be triggered by stress such as exercise, menstruation, or not eating. Diagnosis is based on higher levels of unconjugated bilirubin in the blood without either signs of other liver problems or red blood cell breakdown.

Typically no treatment is needed. Gilbert syndrome is associated with decreased cardiovascular health risks. If jaundice is significant phenobarbital may be used, which aids in the conjugation of bilirubin. Gilbert syndrome affects about 5% of people in the United States. Males are more often diagnosed than females. It is often not noticed until late childhood to early adulthood. The condition was first described in 1901 by Augustin Nicolas Gilbert.

Signs and symptoms

Jaundice
Gilbert syndrome produces an elevated level of unconjugated bilirubin in the bloodstream, but normally has no consequences. Mild jaundice may appear under conditions of exertion, stress, fasting, and infections, but the condition is otherwise usually asymptomatic. Severe cases are seen by yellowing of the skin tone and yellowing of the conjunctiva in the eye.

Gilbert syndrome has been reported to contribute to an accelerated onset of neonatal jaundice. The syndrome cannot cause severe indirect hyperbilirubinemia in neonates by itself, but it may have a summative effect on rising bilirubin when combined with other factors, for example in the presence of increased red blood cell destruction due to diseases such as G6PD deficiency. This situation can be especially dangerous if not quickly treated, as the high bilirubin causes irreversible neurological disability in the form of kernicterus.

Detoxification of certain drugs
The enzymes that are defective in GS – UDP glucuronosyltransferase 1 family, polypeptide A1 (UGT1A1) – are also responsible for some of the liver's ability to detoxify certain drugs. For example, Gilbert syndrome is associated with severe diarrhea and neutropenia in patients who are treated with irinotecan, which is metabolized by UGT1A1.

While paracetamol (acetaminophen) is not metabolized by UGT1A1, it is metabolized by one of the other enzymes also deficient in some people with GS. A subset of people with GS may have an increased risk of paracetamol toxicity.

Cardiovascular effects
The mild increase in unconjugated bilirubin due to Gilbert syndrome is closely related to the reduction in the prevalence of chronic diseases, especially cardiovascular disease and type 2 diabetes, related risk factors, and all-cause mortality. Observational studies emphasize that the antioxidant effects of unconjugated bilirubin may bring survival benefits to patients.

Several analyses have found a significantly decreased risk of coronary artery disease (CAD) in individuals with GS.

Specifically, people with mildly elevated levels of bilirubin (1.1 mg/dl to 2.7 mg/dl) were at lower risk for CAD and at lower risk for future heart disease. These researchers went on to perform a meta-analysis of data available up to 2002, and confirmed the incidence of atherosclerotic disease (hardening of the arteries) in subjects with GS had a close and inverse relationship to the serum bilirubin. This beneficial effect was attributed to bilirubin IXα which is recognized as a potent antioxidant, rather than confounding factors such as high-density lipoprotein levels.

This association was also seen in long-term data from the Framingham Heart Study. Moderately elevated levels of bilirubin in people with GS and the (TA)7/(TA)7 genotype were associated with one-third the risk for both coronary heart disease and cardiovascular disease as compared to those with the (TA)6/(TA)6 genotype (i.e. a normal, nonmutated gene locus).

Platelet counts and MPV (mean platelet volume) are decreased in patients with Gilbert's syndrome. The elevated levels of bilirubin and decreasing levels of MPV and CRP in Gilbert's syndrome patients may have an effect on the slowing down of the atherosclerotic process.

Other
Symptoms, whether connected or not to GS, have been reported in a subset of those affected: fatigue (feeling tired all the time), difficulty maintaining concentration, unusual patterns of anxiety, loss of appetite, nausea, abdominal pain, loss of weight, itching (with no rash), and others, such as humor change or depression. But scientific studies found no clear pattern of adverse symptoms related to the elevated levels of unconjugated bilirubin in adults. However, other substances glucuronidized by the affected enzymes in those with Gilbert's syndrome could theoretically, at their toxic levels, cause these symptoms.  Consequently, debate exists about whether GS should be classified as a disease. However, Gilbert syndrome has been linked to an increased risk of gallstones.

Cause 
Mutations in the UGT1A1 gene lead to Gilbert Syndrome. The gene provides instructions for making the bilirubin uridine diphosphate glucuronosyltransferase (bilirubin-UGT) enzyme, which can be found in the liver cells and responsible for the removal of bilirubin from the body.

The bilirubin-UGT enzyme performs a chemical reaction called glucuronidation. Glucuronic acid is transferred to unconjugated bilirubin, which is a yellowish pigment made when your body breaks down old red blood cells, and then being converted to conjugated bilirubin during the reaction. Conjugated bilirubin passes from the liver into the intestines with bile. It's then excreted in stool.

People with Gilbert syndrome have approximately 30 percent of normal bilirubin-UGT enzyme function, which contributes to a lower rate of glucuronidation of unconjugated bilirubin. This substance then accumulates in the body, causing mild hyperbilirubinemia.

Genetics
Gilbert syndrome is a phenotypic effect, mostly associated with increased blood bilirubin levels, but also sometimes characterized by mild jaundice due to increased unconjugated bilirubin, that arises from several different genotypic variants of the gene for the enzyme responsible for changing bilirubin to the conjugated form.

Gilbert's syndrome is characterized by a 70–80% reduction in the glucuronidation activity of the enzyme (UGT1A1). The UGT1A1 gene is located on human chromosome 2.

More than 100 polymorphisms of the UGT1A1 gene are known, designated as UGT1A1*n (where n is the general chronological order of discovery), either of the gene itself or of its promoter region.  UGT1A1 is associated with a TATA box promoter region; this region most commonly contains the genetic sequence A(TA)6TAA; this variant accounts for about 50% of alleles in many populations.  However, several allelic polymorphic variants of this region occur, the most common of which results from adding another dinucleotide repeat TA to the promoter region, resulting in A(TA)7TAA, which is called UGT1A1*28; this common variant accounts for about 40% of alleles in some populations, but is seen less often, around 3% of alleles, in Southeast and East Asian people and Pacific Islanders.

In most populations, Gilbert syndrome is most commonly associated with homozygous A(TA)7TAA alleles.  In 94% of GS cases, two other glucuronosyltransferase enzymes, UGT1A6 (rendered 50% inactive) and UGT1A7 (rendered 83% ineffective), are also affected.

However, Gilbert syndrome can arise without TATA box promoter polymorphic variants; in some populations, particularly healthy Southeast and East Asians, Gilbert's syndrome is more often a consequence of heterozygote missense mutations (such as Gly71Arg also known as UGT1A1*6, Tyr486Asp also known as UGT1A1*7, Pro364Leu also known as UGT1A1*73) in the actual gene coding region, which may be associated with significantly higher bilirubin levels.

Because of its effects on drug and bilirubin breakdown and because of its genetic inheritance, Gilbert's syndrome can be classed as a minor inborn error of metabolism.

Diagnosis
People with GS predominantly have elevated unconjugated bilirubin, while conjugated bilirubin is usually within the normal range or is less than 20% of the total. Levels of bilirubin in GS patients are reported to be from 20 μM to 90 μM (1.2 to 5.3 mg/dl) compared to the normal amount of < 20 μM. GS patients have a ratio of unconjugated/conjugated (indirect/direct) bilirubin commensurately higher than those without GS.

The level of total bilirubin is often further increased if the blood sample is taken after fasting for two days, and a fast can, therefore, be useful diagnostically. A further conceptual step that is rarely necessary or appropriate is to give a low dose of phenobarbital: the bilirubin will decrease substantially.

Tests can also detect DNA variants of UGT1A1 by polymerase chain reaction or DNA fragment sequencing.

Differential diagnosis
While Gilbert syndrome is considered harmless, it is clinically important because it may give rise to a concern about a blood or liver condition, which could be more dangerous.  However, these conditions have additional indicators:
 In GS, unless another disease of the liver is also present, the liver enzymes ALT/SGPT and AST/SGOT, as well as albumin, are within normal ranges.
 More severe types of glucuronyl transferase disorders such as Crigler–Najjar syndrome (types I and II) are much more severe, with 0–10% UGT1A1 activity, with affected individuals at risk of brain damage in infancy (type I) and teenage years (type II).
 Hemolysis of any cause can be excluded by a full blood count, haptoglobin, lactate dehydrogenase levels, and the absence of reticulocytosis (elevated reticulocytes in the blood would usually be observed in haemolytic anaemia).
 Dubin–Johnson syndrome and Rotor syndrome are rarer autosomal recessive disorders characterized by an increase of conjugated bilirubin.
 Viral hepatitis associated with increase of conjugated bilirubin can be excluded by negative blood samples for antigens specific to the different hepatitis viruses.
 Cholestasis can be excluded by normal levels of bile acids in plasma, the absence of lactate dehydrogenase, low levels of conjugated bilirubin, and ultrasound scan of the bile ducts. 
 Vitamin B12 deficiency - elevated bilirubin levels (and MCV counts above 90–92) can be associated with a vitamin B12 deficiency.

Treatment
Typically no treatment is needed. If jaundice is significant phenobarbital may be used.

History 
Gilbert syndrome was first described by French gastroenterologist Augustin Nicolas Gilbert and co-workers in 1901. In German literature, it is commonly associated with Jens Einar Meulengracht.

Alternative, less common names for this disorder include:
 Familial benign unconjugated hyperbilirubinaemia
 Constitutional liver dysfunction
 Familial non-hemolytic non-obstructive jaundice
 Icterus intermittens juvenilis
 Low-grade chronic hyperbilirubinemia
 Unconjugated benign bilirubinemia

Society and culture

Notable cases
 Napoleon
 Arthur Kornberg, Nobel laureate in Physiology or Medicine, 1959
 Nicky Wire, Manic Street Preachers bassist
 Alexandr Dolgopolov (tennis player)
 Jonas Folger, MotoGP rider

 Huo Yuanjia (master of Chinese martial art)

 David Barnea (Mossad Chief)

References

External links 
 Understanding Gilbert's Syndrome and living better with Gilbert's Syndrome symptoms
 
 Gilbert's Syndrome BMJ Best Practices monograph

Accessory digestive gland disorders
Hepatology
Heme metabolism disorders
Genetic syndromes
Pediatrics
Wikipedia medicine articles ready to translate